The 1996 World Karate Championships are the 13th edition of the World Karate Championships, and were held in Sun City, South Africa from November 7 to November 11, 1996.

Medalists

Men

Women

Medal table

References

 Results
 Results

External links
 World Karate Federation

World Championships
World Karate Championships
World Karate Championships
Karate Championships
Karate competitions in South Africa
Moses Kotane Local Municipality
Sport in North West (South African province)